Homberger is a surname. Notable people with the surname include:

Alex Homberger (1912–2007), Swiss rower
Daniel Homberger (born 1955), Swiss rower
Dominique G. Homberger (born 1948), American zoologist
Ernst Homberger (1869–1955), Swiss industrialist
Esther Fischer-Homberger (1940–2019), Swiss psychiatrist and medical historian
Hans Homberger (1908–1986), Swiss rower
Rudolf Homberger (1910–?), Swiss rower